Snap general elections were held in Saint Kitts and Nevis on 5 August 2022, following the decision of incumbent prime minister Timothy Harris to dissolve the parliament on 11 May. Snap elections are constitutionally required within ninety days following the dissolution of parliament.

The elections were the first in the country with a female party leader, with businesswoman and environmental consultant Janice Daniel-Hodge leading the Nevis Reformation Party (NRP), which was founded by her father, former Premier of Nevis and pro-Nevis secessionist Simeon Daniel. However, the NRP failed to win a seat, despite seeing a small overall increase in vote share.

The elections brought the Saint Kitts and Nevis Labour Party, led by Terrance Drew, back to power for the first time since their loss in 2015. The People's Action Movement was reduced to only one seat, their worst result since 2004, while their vote share of 16.23% was the worst received in party history.

Background
The Team Unity alliance first came to power in the 2015 elections, and won a second term in 2020. In 2022, tensions between PM Harris and his coalition partners led to them filing a motion of no confidence against him. The now in-opposition parties asked Governor-General Sir Tapley Seaton to dismiss Harris, prompting Seaton to remind them he does not have this power under the federation constitution. Harris responded by calling for the dissolution of parliament before the motion of no confidence was held.

Electoral system
Eleven of the fifteen seats in the National Assembly are elected, with the other three members appointed by the Governor-General at some point after the elections and one seat held by the Attorney-General. The eleven elected seats are elected in single-member constituencies using plurality voting.

Parties and Candidates 
Six parties are contesting the election, three parties each contesting all seats in St. Kitts and three parties each contesting seats in Nevis:

 People’s Labour Party (PLP): contesting all eight seats in St Kitts
 St Kitts-Nevis Labour Party (SKNLP): contesting all eight seats in St Kitts
 People’s Action Movement (PAM): contesting all eight seats in St Kitts (One Movement Alliance)
 Concerned Citizens Movement (CCM): contesting all three seats in Nevis (One Movement Alliance)
 Nevis Reformation Party (NRP): contesting all three seats in Nevis
 Moral Restoration Movement (MRM): contesting two of the three seats in Nevis

Endorsements

Opinion polls

Results

Elected MPs

Aftermath
Terrance Drew was elected Prime Minister of Saint Kitts and Nevis. The Drew ministry was sworn in on 15 August 2022.

Notes

References

External links
Saint Kitts and Nevis on the Political Database of the Americas
Adam Carr's Election Archive

Saint Kitts
General
Elections in Saint Kitts and Nevis
Saint Kitts